Gert Handberg (born 30 May 1969 in Brastrup, Denmark) is a former international motorcycle speedway rider. Gert joined Cradley Speedway in 1988 on a recommendation after winning the Danish Junior Championship. He was a member of the Denmark speedway team when they won the 1991 World Team Cup. He also won the World Under-21 Championship in 1989 and finished 3rd in the 1992 senior world final.

He rode in the UK for the Cradley Heathens and in Sweden for Dackarna

World Final Appearances

Individual World Championship
 1991 -  Göteborg, Ullevi - Reserve - did not ride
 1992 -  Wrocław, Olympic Stadium - 3rd - 10pts

World Team Cup
 1989 -  Bradford, Odsal Stadium - (with Hans Nielsen / Erik Gundersen / John Jørgensen / Brian Karger) - 2nd - 34pts (9)

References

1969 births
Living people
Danish speedway riders
Cradley Heathens riders